Krzysztof Siemion (born February 1, 1966 ) is a Polish weightlifter. He won the Silver medal in 82.5 Kg in the 1992 Summer Olympics in Barcelona. .

References

1966 births
Living people
Olympic medalists in weightlifting
Olympic silver medalists for Poland
Olympic weightlifters of Poland
Weightlifters at the 1988 Summer Olympics
Weightlifters at the 1992 Summer Olympics
Weightlifters at the 2000 Summer Olympics
Medalists at the 1992 Summer Olympics
People from Opole Lubelskie County
Polish male weightlifters
20th-century Polish people
21st-century Polish people